Randal Alexander McDonnell, 10th Earl of Antrim DL (born 2 July 1967), previously known as Viscount Dunluce, is a Northern Irish landowner, with an estate based at Glenarm Castle, and a City of London businessman, chairman of Sarasin & Partners LLP. He is also a Deputy Lord Lieutenant of County Antrim and Chief of the Name of the Clan McDonnell of the Glens.

Life 
The only son of Alexander McDonnell, 9th Earl of Antrim, and a grandson of the sculptor Angela Sykes, the present Lord Antrim was educated at Gresham's School and Worcester College, Oxford, where he graduated in Modern History. He is the brother of Lady Flora McDonnell and a nephew of the artist Hector McDonnell. 

After Oxford, Dunluce, as he then was, embarked on a career in asset management in the City of London. In 1992, when he was twenty-five, his father put him in charge of the Glenarm Castle estate, and in that role he diversified to achieve sustainability, investing in Glenarm Shorthorn Beef, Glenarm Organic Salmon, and hydroelectric power. Glenarm Castle was first built in 1603 by Antrim’s ancestor Randal MacSorley MacDonnell.

In 1998 he began to work at Sarasin & Partners LLP, where he has been chairman since 2008, taking responsibility for the investment mandates of the firm’s largest customers and its charitable endowments. He is also a non-executive director of Aberdeen Standard Asia Focus PLC. In 2002, he was a member of three London clubs, the Savile, the Turf, and the Beefsteak.

As Lord Dunluce, Antrim married Aurora Gunn in 2004. They have a son, Alexander, Viscount Dunluce (born 2006) and a daughter, Lady Helena McDonnell (born 2008), both at school in England. Lady Antrim is a documentary filmmaker and member of the Board of the Royal Parks.

In December 2013, as Dunluce, he was appointed a Deputy Lieutenant for County Antrim. 

When his father died on 21 July 2021, Antrim inherited his peerages and estates.

In November 2021, Antrim, Edwin Poots, and local children planted the first trees of 350 hectares of new native woodland on Antrim’s estate at Glenarm Forest. Poots, Minister of Agriculture, Environment and Rural Affairs, announced this as Northern Ireland’s first Queen's Commonwealth Canopy forest conservation project.

Notes

1967 births
Deputy Lieutenants of Antrim
Living people
People educated at Gresham's School
Alumni of Worcester College, Oxford
Earls of Antrim